Kurt Caceres (born Kurt Heinzman; October 18, 1972) is an American actor of German and Mexican descent. He is best known for his role as Hector Avila on the hit Fox drama  Prison Break.

Life and career
He was also a standout football player during his college days while attending Sacramento State University. He also stars in the video game in the Need for Speed franchise Need for Speed: Undercover as Hector Maio, a street racer/car thief.

Filmography

Television

Films, Specials, Documentaries and Made-for-TV Movies

Web

Videogames

References

External links

1972 births
Living people
American people of German descent
American male actors of Mexican descent
American male television actors
People from Napa, California
California State University, Sacramento alumni